The 2018 Blancpain GT Series Asia was the second season of SRO Motorsports Group and Team Asia One GT Management's Blancpain GT Series Asia, an auto racing series for grand tourer cars in Asia. The races were contested with GT3-spec and GT4-spec cars. The season began on 14 April at Sepang and ended on 14 October at Ningbo.

Calendar
At the annual press conference during the 2017 24 Hours of Spa on 28 July, the Stéphane Ratel Organisation announced the first draft of the 2018 calendar. Initially, no changes were made to the schedule compared to 2017. On 27 September 2017, it was announced the races in Buriram were moved one week earlier to avoid a clash with the 3 Hours of Silverstone. On 29 January 2018, it was announced Ningbo would replace Zhejiang as the final round of the season.

Entry list

GT3

GT4

Race results
Bold indicates overall winner.

Championship standings
Scoring system
Championship points were awarded for the first ten positions in each race. Entries were required to complete 75% of the winning car's race distance in order to be classified and earn points. Individual drivers were required to participate for a minimum of 25 minutes in order to earn championship points in any race.

Drivers' championships

Overall

Notes
1 – Shaun Thong was a guest driver at Shanghai and Ningbo and therefore ineligible to score points.
2 – Wei Xu and Naoki Yokomizo were guest drivers at Shanghai and therefore ineligible to score points.

Silver Cup

Notes
1 – Shaun Thong was a guest driver at Shanghai and Ningbo and therefore ineligible to score points.

Pro-Am Cup

Notes
1 – Wei Xu and Naoki Yokomizo were guest drivers at Shanghai and therefore ineligible to score points.

Am Cup

Notes
The awarded points in the Am class in both races at Buriram, Race 1 at Shanghai and both races at Ningbo were divided by two, because there were less than three starters.

Teams' championship
Only the two best results of a team per race counted towards the Teams' championship.

See also
2018 Blancpain GT Series
2018 Blancpain GT Series Endurance Cup
2018 Blancpain GT Series Sprint Cup

Notes

References

External links

Blancpain GT Series Asia
Blancpain GT Series Asia